Wilcox Township was a township in Hancock County, Illinois, USA.  As of the 2010 census, its population was 189 and it contained 82 housing units. It was formed from the rural portion of Warsaw Township on November 15, 1855, when that township became co-extensive with the city of Warsaw. In November 2016, the township voted to merge with Rocky Run Township due to low population. It is now part of Rocky Run-Wilcox Township.

Geography

Cemeteries
The township contains Green Plains Cemetery.

Major highways
  Illinois Route 96

Airports and landing strips
 Warsaw Airport

Demographics

School districts
 Hamilton Community Consolidated School District 328
 Warsaw Community Unit School District 316

Political districts
 Illinois's 17th congressional district
 State House District 94
 State Senate District 47

References
 United States Census Bureau 2008 TIGER/Line Shapefiles
 
 United States National Atlas

External links
 City-Data.com
 Illinois State Archives
 Township Officials of Illinois

Townships in Hancock County, Illinois
Townships in Illinois
Populated places disestablished in 2016